The 1975 All-Ireland Senior Camogie Championship Final was the 44th All-Ireland Final and the deciding match of the 1975 All-Ireland Senior Camogie Championship, an inter-county camogie tournament for the top teams in Ireland.

Wexford took their second All-Ireland with a shock victory over Cork.

References

All-Ireland Senior Camogie Championship Finals
All-Ireland Senior Camogie Championship Final
All-Ireland Senior Camogie Championship Final
All-Ireland Senior Camogie Championship Final, 1975